KCEF may refer to:

 KCEF (FM), a radio station (93.3 FM) licensed to serve Chefornak, Alaska, United States
 Westover Air Reserve Base (ICAO code KCEF)